Saint Lucius is the name of:
 Pope Lucius I (died 254), pope from June 25, 253 to March 4, 254
 Lucius (died 259), one of the Martyrs of Carthage under Valerian
 Saint Lucius of Chur, first bishop of Chur (feast on Dec 2)
 Saint Lucius of Cyrene, one of the founders of the Christian Church in Antioch of Syria (feast on May 6)
 Lucius of Britain, semi-legendary king of Britain
 Ptolemaeus and Lucius (died 165), Christian martyrs
 Quintian, Lucius and Julian (died 430), African martyrs
 Saint Nohra (or Nuhra), also known as St. Lucius, a Maronite saint
 Bishop Lucius of Caesarea, one of the Martyrs of Caesarea (also known as Luke and Lucas)
 St. Lucius of OPG, Patron Saint of Respectful Work Environment